Colegate is a surname. Notable people with the surname include:

Arthur Colegate (1884–1956), British politician
Isabel Colegate (born 1931), English writer and literary agent